Arthur Ormston (born 3 June 1900 in Alnwick) was an English association footballer, who played for eight different clubs in the Football League during the interwar period.

After brief spells with Radcliffe Welfare United and South Shields, Ormston made his Football League debut with Chesterfield during the 1921–22 season. He went on to play for Durham City, Coventry City, Barrow, Wigan Borough, Oldham Athletic, Bradford City, Bristol Rovers and Oldham again, all in quick succession. After this he dropped out of the League and made further appearances for Blyth Spartans, Stalybridge Celtic and Macclesfield.

Personal life
Ormston was born in 1900 in Alnwick, Northumberland, the son of William and Mary Ormston. He had two older brothers, Albert and Ernest, and began attending Warkworth County First School in 1905.

He died on 13 October 1947 in Oldham, aged 47.

References

1900 births
1947 deaths
People from Alnwick
Footballers from Northumberland
English footballers
Association football forwards
South Shields F.C. (1889) players
Chesterfield F.C. players
Durham City A.F.C. players
Coventry City F.C. players
Barrow A.F.C. players
Wigan Borough F.C. players
Oldham Athletic A.F.C. players
Bradford City A.F.C. players
Bristol Rovers F.C. players
Blyth Spartans A.F.C. players
Stalybridge Celtic F.C. players
Macclesfield Town F.C. players